Leonid Vasilevich Nikolaev (10 May 1904 – 29 December 1934) was the assassin of Sergei Kirov, the first secretary of the Leningrad branch of the Communist Party.

Early life

Nikolaev was a troubled young Soviet Communist Party member in Leningrad. He had difficulty holding a job, and had been reprimanded by the Party for having refused a posting that was not to his liking. Eventually, the Party expelled him as a member. Unemployed, he soon ran short of money, and blamed the Party for his troubles. His wife Milda Draule was a member of a regional party committee and he had a strong suspicion that she had a love affair with Sergei Kirov, the Party administrator of the Leningrad district.

The Kirov Assassination
It is unknown whether Nikolaev had had prior dealings with the Leningrad branch of the Soviet government, headed by Kirov. As Nikolaev's troubles grew, he became steadily more obsessed with the idea of "striking a blow".  On 15 October 1934, he was arrested by the NKVD, allegedly for loitering around the Smolny Institute, where Kirov had his offices. The Smolny guards had discovered a loaded 7.62 mm Nagant M1895 revolver in Nikolaev's briefcase. Some Soviet sources later argued that Nikolaev did have a permit to carry a loaded handgun. After Nikolaev's visit, the NKVD failed to augment Kirov's security; instead, it withdrew all police protection for Kirov with the exception of a police escort to Smolny and a manned security post at the entrance to his offices. 
  
On the afternoon of 1 December 1934, Nikolaev paid a final visit to the Smolny Institute offices. With Stalin's alleged approval, the NKVD had previously withdrawn the remaining guards manning the security desk at Smolny.  Unopposed, Nikolaev made his way to the third floor, where he shot Kirov in the back of the neck with his Nagant revolver. 

As former Soviet official and author Alexander Barmine noted, "the negligence of the NKVD in protecting such a high party official was without precedent in the Soviet Union". According to later press accounts and party communiques, which were never substantiated, Nikolaev was apprehended with the aid of an electrician, Platanov, who was working in the area; a friend of Kirov's, a middle-aged man named Borisev, also rushed out and helped subdue Nikolaev, who was said to have undergone a complete collapse and had to be carried away.

Aftermath and responsibility for Kirov's death
After Kirov's death, Stalin called for swift punishment of the traitors and those found negligent in Kirov's death. Borisov, one of the first to come upon the scene, was immediately arrested; he died the day after Kirov's assassination, allegedly as the result of a fall from a truck in which he was being transported by the NKVD. On 28–29 December 1934, Nikolaev and 13 other people as members of the "counterrevolutionary group" were tried by the Military Collegium of the Supreme Court of the USSR under Vasili Ulrikh's chairmanship. At 5:45 a.m., 29 December, all of them were sentenced to death and executed by shooting an hour later.

Several NKVD officers from the Leningrad branch were convicted of negligence for not adequately protecting Kirov and were sentenced to prison terms of up to ten years. Barmine claimed they never served their prison sentences; instead, they were transferred to executive posts in Stalin's labour camps for a period of time (in effect, a demotion).

Initially, a Communist Party communiqué reported that Nikolaev's guilt had been established and that he had confessed that he acted at the behest of a 'fascist power', receiving money from an unidentified 'foreign consul' in Leningrad. Barmine further claimed 104 other defendants, who were already in prison at the time of Kirov's assassination, who had no demonstrable connection to Nikolaev, were found guilty of complicity in the 'fascist plot' against Kirov and were summarily executed.

A few days later, during a Communist Party meeting of the Moscow District, the Party secretary announced in a speech that Nikolaev had been personally interrogated by Stalin the very next day after the assassination, an unheard-of event for a party leader such as Stalin,

Other speakers rose to condemn the Opposition, "The Central Committee must be pitiless - the Party must be purged...the record of every member must be scrutinized...."  No one at the meeting mentioned the theory of fascist agents. Later, Stalin used the Kirov assassination to eliminate the remainder of the Opposition leadership against him, accusing Grigory Zinoviev, Lev Kamenev, Abram Prigozhin and others who had stood with Kirov in opposing Stalin (or simply failed to acquiesce to Stalin's views), of having connections with Nikolaev and facilitating the assassination. 
  
After Nikolaev's death, there was some speculation that his motivation in killing Kirov may have been more personal. His wife worked at the Smolny and unsubstantiated rumours surfaced that she was having an affair with Kirov. It is unknown whether these had a basis in fact, or were deliberately fostered by the NKVD. According to Amy Knight, Nikolaev's wife, Milda Draule, was noted for her physical plainness, while Kirov was known to prefer liaisons with ballerinas and other Soviet women of notable beauty and grace.
 
Kirov's death  meant the beginning of Stalin's Great Purge.  As author and Menshevik scholar Boris Nikolaevsky pointed out,

{{quote|One thing is certain: the only man who profited by the Kirov assassination was Stalin.<ref>Nikolaevsky, Boris, The Kirov Assassination, The New Leader, 23 August 1941</ref>}}

Notes

References
 Barmine, Alexander, One Who Survived, New York: G.P. Putnam (1945)
 Knight, Amy, Who Killed Kirov: The Kremlin's Greatest Mystery''

1904 births
1934 deaths
Soviet assassins
Soviet people convicted of murder
People convicted of murder by the Soviet Union
Deaths by firearm in the Soviet Union
Executed assassins
Kirov murder
1934 murders in the Soviet Union